Gypsy Rose may refer to:
 Gypsy Rose Lee (1911–1970), American burlesque entertainer and vedette 
 Gypsy Rose Blanchard (born 1991), American woman convicted of second-degree murder of her mother in 2015 (see: Murder of Dee Dee Blanchard)
 Gypsy Rose, famous lowrider owned by Jesse Valadez